Noa Selimhodžić (born 15 October 2003) is an Israeli footballer who plays as a midfielder for German club 1. FFC Turbine Potsdam and the Israel women's national team.

She also holds a Bosnian citizenship.

Early life
Her parents, Aleksandra and Damir Selimhodzic are refugees from Bosnia (then part of former Yugoslavia) who fled the Bosnian War and arrived in Israel – where Noa was born and raised; and they reside in Netanya, Israel. Her older brother is Israeli footballer Adi Selimhodzic.

She attended the Ruppin High School.

Club career
Selimhodzic started to play in Israeli club Maccabi Netanya's boys team at the age of 8. She has played for Youth Academy and Maccabi Emek Hefer in Israel.

Milan
In October 2021, Selimhodzic joined Italian club AC Milan, signing a three-year contract. In November, she made her debut, coming on as a substitute in the 81st minute of a 1–0 victory over Empoli.

1. FFC Turbine Potsdam

In July 27, 2022 Selimhodzic joined German club 1. FFC Turbine Potsdam.

International career
Selimhodzic has been capped for the Israel national team, appearing for the senior squad during the 2023 FIFA Women's World Cup qualifiers. She scored her debut goal for the senior team in February 2022, in a 2–2 friendly match against Greece.

International goals

See also
List of Israelis
Sports in Israel
Irena Kuznetsov

References

External links
 Noa Selimhodzic – UEFA competition record
 
 
 

2003 births
Living people
Israeli women's footballers
Women's association football midfielders
Maccabi Netanya F.C. (women) players
A.C. Milan Women players
1. FFC Turbine Potsdam players
Israel women's international footballers
Israeli expatriate women's footballers
Israeli expatriate sportspeople in Italy
Expatriate women's footballers in Italy
Israeli expatriate sportspeople in Germany
Expatriate women's footballers in Germany
Israeli people of Bosnia and Herzegovina descent
Israeli people of Yugoslav descent
Bosnia and Herzegovina footballers